Douye Diri (born 4 June 1959) is a Nigerian politician and Governor of Bayelsa State. He was the senator representing Bayelsa Central senatorial district of Bayelsa state at the Nigerian 9th National Assembly.

Early life 
Douye Diri began his early education at Okoro Primary School, Sampou and concluded it at Rev. Proctor Memorial Primary School, Kaiama in 1977, where he obtained his First School Leaving Certificate. He later attended Government Secondary School, Odi in Bayelsa. Douye studied at the College of Education, Port-Harcourt, Rivers State where he obtained a National Certificate in Education (NCE) in 1985. He also attended the University of Port-Harcourt, obtaining a Bachelors of Education (B. Ed) Degree in Political Science in 1990.

Governor of Bayelsa
On 13 February 2020, the Supreme Court of Nigeria invalidated the results of the 2019 Bayelsa State gubernatorial elections on grounds that the running mate of the actual winner of the election, David Lyon, submitted a confidential certificate to the Independent National Electoral Commission. 
The court ordered Diri to be issued a certificate of return, which would make him governor-elect.

On 14 February 2020, he was sworn-in as the governor of Bayelsa State.

August 2020 court rulings 
On 17 August 2020, a tribunal at Abuja, Nigeria, ordered Diri sacked as the state governor. However, on 2 October 2020, a court of appeal sitting in Abuja overruled the tribunal court and confirmed him as Governor.

Airport security controversy
In August 2021, it was reported that Diri and his aides had forced their way through security checkpoints at Murtala Muhammed International Airport while trying to board the inaugural United Nigeria Airlines Lagos-to-Yenagoa flight.

See also
List of Governors of Bayelsa State

References 

Living people
1959 births
Governors of Bayelsa State
Peoples Democratic Party (Nigeria) politicians